Noel Reid (born 22 May 1990) is an Irish rugby union player who currently plays for the Toronto Arrows in Major League Rugby (MLR). His preferred position is fly-half or centre.

Between 2011 and 2019 he played 120 games for Leinster. He has also played professionally for Leicester Tigers, London Irish and Agen.

Early career
In 2007, Reid won the Leinster Schools Rugby Senior Cup with St Michael's College.

Professional career

Leinster
He made his senior debut in September 2012 against the Scarlets and scored a hattrick on his debut. During his time at Leinster he was part of three European Rugby Champions Cup winning squads and four Pro14 winning squads.

Leicester Tigers
Ahead of the 2019–20 season, Reid joined English Premiership side Leicester Tigers. He left ahead of the 2020–21 season, having made 19 appearances.

Agen
He signed with France Top14 side Agen ahead of the 2020–21 season. Agen was relegated at the end of the season with Reid having made 11 appearances. After a further 5 appearances in the ProD2, he left for London Irish.

London Irish
Reid was signed by Premiership Rugby side London Irish in February 2022 for the remainder of the 2021–22 season. He made his debut against Harlequin sin the Premiership Rugby Cup.

Ireland
Reid made his senior debut for Ireland on 14 June 2014 when coming off the bench in the second test of the tour to Argentina.

References

External links
Leinster Profile
Pro14 Profile

Living people
1990 births
People educated at St Michael's College, Dublin
Rugby union players from Dublin (city)
Clontarf FC players
Leinster Rugby players
Ireland international rugby union players
Ireland Wolfhounds international rugby union players
Rugby union centres
Rugby union fly-halves
Leicester Tigers players
Irish expatriate rugby union players
Expatriate rugby union players in England
Irish expatriate sportspeople in England
SU Agen Lot-et-Garonne players
London Irish players
Toronto Arrows players
Expatriate rugby union players in France
Expatriate rugby union players in Canada
Irish expatriate sportspeople in Canada
Irish expatriate sportspeople in France